The Cleveland Browns were a charter member club of the All-America Football Conference (AAFC) when the league was founded in 1946. From 1946 to 1949, the Browns won each of the league’s four championships. While the National Football League (NFL) does not recognize the Browns’ AAFC championships, the Pro Football Hall of Fame does recognize the team’s championships, which is reflected in this list. The Browns went on to win three NFL championships, nearly dominating the NFL in the 1950s, and won one more NFL championship in 1964. The team has yet to appear in a Super Bowl, however. Overall, the team has won eight championships: four in the AAFC, and four in the NFL.

In , then-Browns owner Art Modell made the decision to move the team from Cleveland, Ohio to Baltimore, Maryland. An agreement between the city of Cleveland and the NFL kept the team’s history, name and colors in Cleveland, while Modell’s new team would be regarded as an expansion team. For record-keeping purposes, the Browns are considered to have suspended operations from 1996 to 1998, which is reflected in this list. In 2017, the Cleveland Browns became the second team in NFL history (2008 Detroit Lions) to suffer an 0–16 record. In 2020, the Browns won their first playoff game since their reactivation in 1999, defeating the division champion Pittsburgh Steelers in the Wild Card Round.

Seasons
 For a complete team history, see History of the Cleveland Browns.

Footnotes

References 

 
 
 
 
 
 
 
 

 
Cleveland Browns
Seasons